Archbishop Sava may refer to:

 Archbishop Sava I, Serbian Archbishop from 1219 to 1233
 Archbishop Sava II, Serbian Archbishop from 1263 to 1271
 Archbishop Sava III, Serbian Archbishop from 1309 to 1316
 Archbishop Sava IV, Archbishop of Peć and Serbian Patriarch from 1354 to 1375
 Archbishop Sava V, Archbishop of Peć and Serbian Patriarch from 1396 to 1406

See also
Patriarch Sava (disambiguation)
Archbishop Arsenije (disambiguation)
List of heads of the Serbian Orthodox Church